Mercedes-AMG GmbH, commonly known as AMG, is the high-performance subsidiary of Mercedes-Benz AG. AMG independently hires engineers and contracts with manufacturers to customize Mercedes-Benz AMG vehicles. The company has its headquarters in Affalterbach, Baden-Württemberg, Germany.

AMG was originally an independent engineering firm specializing in performance improvements for Mercedes-Benz vehicles. DaimlerChrysler AG took a controlling interest in 1999, then became the sole owner of AMG in 2005. Mercedes-AMG GmbH is now a wholly owned subsidiary of Mercedes-Benz AG, which is in turn owned by the Mercedes-Benz Group.

AMG models typically have more aggressive looks, better performance, better handling, better stability and more carbon fibre than their regular Mercedes-Benz counterparts. AMG models are typically the most expensive and highest-performing variant of each Mercedes-Benz class.

AMG variants are usually badged with two numerals, as opposed to regular Mercedes-Benz vehicles, which have three (e.g. "E 63" as opposed to "E 350"). The numerals do not always indicate engine size, but are rather a tribute to earlier heritage cars, such as the 300 SEL 6.3 litre. For example, newer-model AMG V8s such as the E 63 actually have 4.0L V8s.

The world's first stand-alone Mercedes-AMG dealership, AMG Sydney, was opened in Sydney, Australia in 2018.

History 

AMG was founded as a racing engine forge in 1967 under the name AMG Motorenbau und Entwicklungsgesellschaft mbH (German for 'AMG Engine Production and Development Limited') by former Mercedes-Benz engineers Hans Werner Aufrecht and Erhard Melcher in Burgstall an der Murr, near Stuttgart.  The initialism 'AMG' stands for Aufrecht, Melcher and Großaspach (Aufrecht's birth town).  In 1976, most of AMG moved to Affalterbach, with the racing-engine development remaining at the old location in Burgstall. At this time, Erhard Melcher ceased to be a partner, but he continued to be an employee at the Burgstall location.

In 1993, with AMG having become a high-profile purveyor of modified Mercedes-Benz cars, Daimler-Benz AG and AMG signed a contract of cooperation, allowing AMG to leverage Daimler-Benz's extensive dealer network and leading to commonly developed vehicles (the first one being the Mercedes-Benz C36 AMG, in 1993).

On 1 January 1999, DaimlerChrysler AG (as it was called between 1998 and 2007) acquired 51 percent of AMG shares, and AMG was renamed to Mercedes-AMG GmbH. Racing engine development was divested and continues to exist in Burgstall under the name HWA (Aufrecht's initials). On 1 January 2005, Aufrecht sold his remaining shares to DaimlerChrysler, and since then, Mercedes-AMG GmbH has been a wholly owned subsidiary of the Mercedes-Benz Group.

Development of the product range 

AMG started off by designing and testing racing engines.  It expanded its business into building custom road cars based upon standard Mercedes cars.  AMG initially produced a range of unofficial upgrade and accessories packages mainly for the Mercedes-Benz R107 and C107 (1971–1989 SL roadster), Mercedes-Benz W116 (1972–1980 S-class), Mercedes-Benz W123 (1976–1985 E-class predecessor), Mercedes-Benz W124 (1984–1997 E-class), Mercedes-Benz W126 (1979–1992 S-class), Mercedes-Benz R129 (1989–2001 SL roadster), and Mercedes-Benz W201 (1990–1993 C-class) models.

During the early 1980s and up until 1990, AMG offered a variety of engine performance packages, alloy wheels and styling products as an entirely independent company from Daimler-Benz.  In 1990, AMG signed a co-operation agreement with Daimler-Benz, and AMG options and cars were then offered in Mercedes-Benz showrooms; in 1999 Daimler AG, then known as DaimlerChrysler AG, bought the controlling share of AMG and made them part of the official Mercedes-Benz line-up.

Typical AMG performance enhancements, which the buyer could custom order, included increased engine displacements (5.2 litre, 5.4 litre), performance top ends with port and polished heads and intake, lightened valve train, and more aggressive cams.  The DOHC 32V engine had also just been developed and was the pinnacle of AMG performance.  A Getrag five-speed manual transmission could be ordered from AMG, and Mercedes had not offered a manual transmission V8 since the early 1970s.

The performance wheels offered during the same period were 15-inch or 16-inch ATS AMG Five Spoke Road Wheels, commonly referred to as Pentas.  Penta was actually a UK-based company that supplemented the high demand for the AMG wheel at the time with a replica and only a very slight styling difference, but they were not made or endorsed by AMG. The genuine AMG wheels were often coupled with an AMG performance suspension package that included uprated and lowered springs, and re-valved shock absorbers.

Another popular cosmetic upgrade were the AMG body kits. These ranged from subtle front spoilers to aggressive Wide Body kits for the W126 coupes (reaching more than $700k on the classic market in 2022). Other options included Recaro seats, smaller diameter steering wheels, instrument clusters, chrome delete option (all brightworks colour-coded or painted satin black), refrigerators, shift knobs, hi-fi stereo systems, custom upholstery and enhanced interior wood packages.

The release of the AMG Hammer sedan in 1986, based on the W124 E-Class, took AMG's performance modifications for a fast midsized sedan to a new level. AMG made the world's fastest passenger sedan at the time, nicknamed the Hammer, by squeezing Mercedes 5.6-litre V8 tuned by AMG to 360 hp into a midsized sedan. It was very aggressive for the era, with 32-valve cylinder heads and twin camshafts, and said to be faster than the Lamborghini Countach from 60 to 120 mph. Later models were even more powerful and introduced the 17-inch AMG Aero 1 Hammer wheels. 1986 was also the year Mercedes introduced the 560 M117 engine. This provided yet another opportunity for customers to order the largest AMG displacement available at the time, the 6L 100 mm bore SOHC or DOHC engines available for both the W126 coupe and sedans.

Through the early 2000s, AMG focused principally on supercharged V8 and V6 engines, but the company officially abandoned this technology in 2006 with the introduction of the naturally aspirated 6.2 L M156 V8.  On 16 January 2006, Mercedes-AMG Chairman Volker Mornhinweg told AutoWeek that the company would use turbocharging for higher output rather than supercharging. For 2011, AMG released the M157 5.5L bi-turbo V8, which has supplanted the M156 in its full-sized cars such as the S-Class and CL-Class (and is trickling down to the CLS, E-Class, and ML-class). In 2012, Mercedes-AMG Chairman Olla Kallenius said that Mercedes-AMG will not produce diesel engines to compete with BMW's tri-turbo diesels (BMW M Performance range).

Although there were some AMG models in the 1980s with manual transmissions, almost all recent models have used automatics (5G-Tronic and later 7G-Tronic with Speedshift), in contrast to BMW M, which used manual and recently automatic transmissions (the current type being a dual clutch transmission). Starting in 2009, however, AMG began adopting the seven-speed AMG SpeedShift MCT automatic transmission.

Although these are considered the most well known in-house tuning divisions, Mercedes-AMG has a considerably different philosophy than BMW M. Compared to BMW M, Mercedes-AMG is "less narrow in its sporting focus, yet still combining sledgehammer performance with relaxed handling, cultured comfort, and practicality".

While founders Hans Werner Aufrecht and Erhard Melcher had emphasized proper racing cars, Mercedes-AMG had diverged considerably from this philosophy in recent years, with their offerings being well known for straight-line acceleration but poor handling dynamics. However, current Mercedes-AMG chairman Volker Mornhinweg has urged the division to return to its roots of building sports cars.

Motor racing 

In the late 1960s and early 1970s, AMG entered the big Mercedes-Benz 300SEL 6.3 V8 saloon, affectionately named the "Red Sow", in the 1971 Spa 24 Hours, and the European Touring Car Championship. AMG and Mercedes worked together on Mercedes-Benz W201 cars for the 1988 Deutsche Tourenwagen Meisterschaft (DTM, German Touring Car Championship). AMG was made the official partner.

When DaimlerChrysler acquired a majority share of AMG in 1999, the motor racing department was divested into HWA AG. Their first car was the ill-fated Mercedes-Benz CLR. Since 2000, HWA builds and runs the cars for Deutsche Tourenwagen Masters (DTM), as well as the M271 engine tuned for use in Formula 3.

In 2000, an extensively modified one-off Mercedes-Benz AMG CLK 55 was built by the AMG Factory as a purpose-built race car to compete in the 2001 Targa Tasmania 7 day road race. Mick Doohan was the works Mercedes-Benz AMG driver.

Six successive lightly modified Mercedes-Benz AMG models (including, most recently, a C190 GT R) have acted as the safety cars for the FIA Formula One World Championship.

Since 2010, the SLS AMG GT3 and the AMG GT3 has been competing in GT competitions around the world, such as the FIA GT3 European Championship, Blancpain Endurance Series, Blancpain Sprint Series, VLN, 24 Hours of Nürburgring, British GT Championship, Super GT, Australian GT Championship, Bathurst 12 Hour, Dubai 24 Hour, Macau GT Cup and Pirelli World Challenge.

In late 2011, after the end of the Formula One season, Mercedes GP Petronas announced that it would be using the AMG branding for its F1 efforts, changing its name to Mercedes AMG Petronas for the 2012 season onwards.

Three AMG E-Class V8 Supercars competed in the Australian Supercars Championship from 2013 to 2015, operated by Erebus Motorsport under the AMG Customer Sports Program.

Relationship with Pagani 
AMG also provides engines for the Zonda and Huayra cars.  The M297 7,291 cc displacement V12 engines were originally used in the 1995 SL 73 AMG. It is the largest displacement naturally aspirated engine provided by AMG and is now exclusively used by Pagani.

Relationship with Aston Martin 
On 25 July 2013, Aston Martin Lagonda Ltd and Daimler AG announced moves towards a technical partnership with Mercedes-AMG GmbH. The deal will see Aston Martin access significant Mercedes-AMG GmbH and Mercedes-Benz Cars' resources, allowing the development of bespoke V8 powertrains and the use of certain components of electric/electronic architecture. Daimler AG now owns a stake of 5% of non-voting shares in Aston Martin, joining existing shareholders Investment DAR, Adeem Investment and Investindustrial. The technical partnership will support Aston Martin's launch of a new generation of models and newly developed bespoke V8 powertrains.

For the 2021 and 2022 Formula One World Championship, the German marque shared the role as the official Safety Car supplier with Aston Martin.

Relationship with Lotus 
AMG also provides engines for the Lotus Emira. The M139 I4 engine that was originally used in the CLA 45 AMG.

AMG Trim 
Mercedes-Benz allows customers to upgrade nearly any model by adding an AMG trim or styling package. So customers can customize Mercedes cars to look exactly like an AMG car, minus the all-important AMG engine. AMG trim can include a rear spoiler, body styling, deep front air dam, 18” or 19” AMG style wheels, sport front seats, sport steering wheel, AMG floor mats, sport suspension and sport brakes.

Current AMG models 

All AMG engines - with the exception of the "35" M260 2.0 L Inline-4 Turbo and "43" M276 3.0 L V6 Bi-Turbo engine, as well as various other "43" and "53" models using the new M256 inline 6 engine - are hand built using a "one man, one engine" philosophy at the current AMG plant in Affalterbach, Germany. To signify this, each AMG engine builder stamps the engines they produce with an engraved plaque depicting their signature. According to Mercedes-Benz, there are only about 50 AMG engine builders.

As part of the official Mercedes product line, the AMG models are sold side by side with regular production models, unlike those offered by other Mercedes tuning firms such as Brabus.

"ONE" PU106B 1.6 L V6 E-Turbo Hybrid 
 Mercedes-AMG ONE

"35" M260 2.0 L Inline-4 Turbo 
 Mercedes-AMG A 35
 Mercedes-AMG CLA 35
 Mercedes-AMG GLA 35
 Mercedes-AMG GLB 35

"45" M139 2.0 L Inline-4 Turbo 
 Mercedes-AMG A 45/A 45 S 4MATIC+
 Mercedes-AMG CLA 45/CLA 45 S 4MATIC+
 Mercedes-AMG GLA 45/GLA 45 S 4MATIC+
 Mercedes-AMG C 43

At  and 500 nm in the 45 S variant, the M139 with twin-scroll turbo is the world's most powerful four-cylinder engine in serial production with a specific output of 208 hp per litre or 104 hp per cylinder.

"43" M276 3.0 L V6 Bi-Turbo 
 Mercedes-AMG GLC 43
With the launch of the 3.0l V6 gasoline engine with direct injection and twin turbo-charging, called M276 DE30AL, a new member has been added to the approved M276 V6 gasoline engine series.

"43" M256 3.0 L Inline-6 Turbo 
 Mercedes-AMG GT 43 4-Door Coupé

"53" M256 3.0 L Inline-6 Turbo 
 Mercedes-AMG E 53 (A238/C238/W213/S213)
 Mercedes-AMG CLS 53 (C257)
 Mercedes-AMG GT 53 4-Door Coupé
 Mercedes-AMG GLE 53

These are powered by the new Mercedes-Benz M 256 inline six cylinder engine.

"55" M177 4.0 L V8 Bi-Turbo 
 Mercedes-AMG SL 55 4MATIC+

"63" M177/M178 4.0 L V8 Bi-Turbo 

 Mercedes-AMG C 63
 Mercedes-AMG C 63 Coupe
 Mercedes-AMG E 63
 Mercedes-AMG GT
 Mercedes-AMG SL 63 4MATIC+
 Mercedes-AMG GT 63 4-Door Coupé
 Mercedes-AMG S 63
 Mercedes-AMG GLC 63
 Mercedes-AMG GLC 63 Coupe
 Mercedes-AMG G 63 (W463) second generation
  
Launched in the UK market in April 2015, the 4-litre M178 V8 uses an unusual configuration where the position of the intake and exhaust are reversed, to create a more compact engine and hence vehicle design. This "hot inside v" configuration, as AMG calls it, has the exhaust gasses exiting into the central v area of the engine block where the engine's twin turbochargers are also mounted.

"63 E-PERFORMANCE" M139 2.0 L Inline-4 Turbo PHEV / M256 3.0 L Inline-6 Turbo PHEV / M177 4.0 L V8 Bi-Turbo PHEV 
 Mercedes-AMG C 63 S E-PERFORMANCE
 Mercedes-AMG E 63 S E-PERFORMANCE
 Mercedes-AMG S 63 E-PERFORMANCE

Previous AMG models 
In addition to the models listed above, there were also predecessors to the current AMG models.

"65" M275 6.0 L V12 Bi-Turbo 

The models listed below were powered by a variant of the Mercedes-Benz M275 engine.
 2004–2013 S65 AMG
 2004–2014 CL65 AMG
 2004–2011 SL65 AMG
 2012–2018 G65 AMG
 2012–2018 Mercedes-AMG SL 65
 2014–2019 Mercedes-AMG S 65
The AMG power-plant has an all-new design of the bi-turbo system, which features larger turbochargers and a new, more powerful charge-air cooling system, and the increase in the engine displacement (to 5980 cc) as well as many other engine design measures.

"65" models used a 5-speed automatic transmission for a long time, as the newer 7G-Tronic wasn't able to handle the torque from the V12 engines. This was changed with the introduction of 2012 SL 65 AMG, which uses the same AMG SpeedShift MCT transmission as the rest of the AMG line-up.

Coinciding with the facelift of the CL-Class for the 2011 model year, the 2011 CL 65 AMG had an enhanced engine. AMG redesigned the exhaust gas turbochargers and added new engine electronics. The update also improved fuel economy and reduced carbon emissions by 3.5% over the outgoing model.

"63" M157 5.5 L V8 Bi-Turbo 
The models listed below were powered by the M157 variant of the Mercedes-Benz M278 engine.
 Mercedes-AMG CLS 63 (W219)
 Mercedes-AMG E 63 (W212)
 Mercedes-AMG G 63 (W463)
 Mercedes-AMG GL 63 (X166 pre-facelift)
 Mercedes-AMG GLE 63 (W166 facelift)
 Mercedes-AMG GLS 63 (X166 facelift)
 Mercedes-AMG M 63 (W166 pre-facelift)
 Mercedes-AMG S 63 (W222 pre-facelift)
 Mercedes-AMG SL 63 (R231)

Rumoured in 2009 and confirmed in 2010, AMG developed the M157, a 5.5-litre V8 with direct fuel injection and twin turbochargers. Both engines are mated to Mercedes-Benz's 7-speed MCT transmission.
Unlike the M156 naturally aspirated 6.2 L V8, which was developed entirely within AMG, the M157 is based upon the M278 used in the regular Mercedes-Benz S-Class and CL-Class. The M157 boasts 25% better fuel economy (10.5 litres per 100 kilometres versus 14.4 L/100 km in the European driving cycle) over the M156, meaning it avoids the US Gas Guzzler Tax for the first time ever, despite having up to 47 horsepower more. The M157's increased torque from both the regular version and performance package means the engine can be shifted into a taller gear sooner, keeping engine revs and fuel consumption to a minimum. The new M157 has an engine start/stop mode and is lightweight at 204 kg. The M157 is said to be ideal for powering full-size sedans such as the S-Class, but the older M156 remains in production, as its more precise throttle response is still well suited to smaller sportier models (the C-Class), until the 2015 model arrives, which is powered by a 4.0 liter V8.

5.5 L V8 BiTurbo models carry the "63" model designation, shared with the 6.2L V8 models. Visually, the 2011 S 63 AMG is differentiated from the 2010 model (itself face-lifted over the 2009 S 63) by the more angular design of the chromed dual exhaust tips, which also sport embossed AMG logos, as well as new forged wheels. For the CL 63 AMG, the new M157 engine coincides with the facelift of the CL-Class for the 2011 model year.

Despite common belief, 63 AMG models are typically faster than their 65 AMG counterparts. An S 63 AMG accelerates faster and handles better than an S 65 AMG (due to 4-wheel drive and decreased weight), and an SL 63 AMG accelerates faster than an SL 65 AMG due to decreased torque, lower weight, and better balance by use of the V8.

Since 2013, AMG models with the S-Model package feature all-wheel drive, which allows for better handling and better acceleration. The Mercedes-Benz CLS 63 AMG S has been tested to accelerate to 60 mph in just 3.2 seconds, with a quarter mile time of 11.6 seconds. This made it the quickest production sedan at the time.

"63" M156 6.2 L V8 
 2008-2015 C63 AMG, C63 AMG Black Series, Edition 507 (Sedan and Wagon) (facelifted for the 2012 model year)
 Mercedes E63 AMG (W211)
 Mercedes-Benz CLK 63 AMG, CLK 63 AMG Black Series
 Mercedes-Benz S63 AMG (2008-2011)
 Mercedes-Benz CL63 AMG
 Mercedes-Benz ML63 AMG
 Mercedes-Benz E63 AMG (W212, 2009-2011)
 2010 SLS AMG (M159)

AMG developed its own V8 engine (dubbed M156 in development) for the DTM series. The M156 produces 451 horsepower and 443 ft-lbs of torque. The M156, in various states of tune, was used in models such as the SL 63, E 63, CLS 63, and S 63 until it was replaced by the M157 5.5 L Biturbo V8.

In 2009, AMG developed the M159 engine, which is based on the M156 engine, to use in SLS AMG. The M159 produces 583 horsepower and 489 lb-ft of torque in the Mercedes-Benz SLS AMG GT, and 622 horsepower and 468 lb-ft in the SLS AMG Black Series. There are also other AMG nameplates no longer in production:
 1988–1993 190E AMG 3.2
 1988–1993 300E AMG 3.4E, AMG 3.4CE, AMG 3.4TE
 1992 "The Hammer" AMG Widebody Coupe
 1993–1994 E 60 AMG
 1994–1995 E 36 AMG
 1995, 1997 S 70 AMG
 1995, 1998–2001 SL 73 AMG
 1996–1998 SL 60 AMG
 1995–1997 C 36 AMG
 1997–2000 C 43 AMG
 1996–1998 E 36 AMG
 1996–1997 E 50 AMG
 1998–2002 E 55 AMG
 1998–2002 CLK-GTR AMG
 2001–2004 SLK 32 AMG
 2002–2004 C 32 AMG
 2005–2006 C 55 AMG
 2005–2006 CLK DTM AMG
 2007 R 63 AMG
 2009 CLK 63 AMG and CLK 63 AMG Black Series

"55" M152 5.5 L V8 
 AMG SLK 55
The M152 is a naturally aspirated, detuned version of the M157 Biturbo V8. This V8 will be used for the 2012 SLK 55 AMG, and it produces 415 hp and 398 lb-ft. This engine was discontinued in 2016 with the release of the SLC 43 AMG.

"43" M276 3.0 L V6 Bi-Turbo 
 Mercedes-AMG E 43
 Mercedes-AMG GLE 43
 Mercedes-AMG C 43 4MATIC+
 Mercedes-AMG GLC 43 4MATIC+
 Mercedes-AMG C 43
 Mercedes-AMG SLC 43

"45" M133 2.0 L Inline-4 Turbo 
 Mercedes-AMG GLA 45
 Mercedes-AMG A 45
The 2.0 L Turbo I4 was created for use in the smaller, 45 AMG models, such as the A-Class, CLA-Class, and GLA-Class, which all share the same platform. The M133 (2015 onwards) produces 381 PS (375 HP) and 350 lb-ft (475 Nm), making it the most powerful turbo 4-cylinder in production, and with a 190.5-horsepower per liter, one of the most power dense engines in production. Models with the M133 Turbo 4 are paired with a 7-speed AMG SPEEDSHIFT Dual-Clutch Transmission.

"30" 3.0 L I5 diesel 
 OM612 3.0 L "30" I5 Diesel models
C 30 CDI AMG (sedan, wagon, and Sportcoupé)

"32" 3.2 L V6 KOMPRESSOR 

The engine is a special version of the 3.2 L (3199 cc) M112 E32, fitted with a helical twin-screw supercharger and water-to-air intercooler. The supercharger was developed in conjunction with IHI and features Teflon-coated rotors producing overall boost of 14.5 psi (1 bar). Compared to the standard M112 engine, the AMG version also has a new crankshaft, new connecting rods and pistons, an oil pump with a 70-percent increased capacity, lightweight camshafts, and harder valve springs for a redline of 6200 rpm, an increase of 200 rpm.

While rival BMW M developed the SMG-II automated manual for the BMW M3, the C 32 and SLK 32 have a 5-speed automatic transmission's "Speedshift" system, which now has quicker response (up to 35 percent) to accelerator and shift selector movements.

The C 32 had a smaller engine than its predecessors, the C 36 AMG with the M104 3.6L I6 engine, and the C 43 AMG powered by the M113 4.3L V8 engine. The C 32 AMG can do 0– in 5.2sec 0–100 in 12.6 with a 1/4 mile of 13.6 at 106 mph (C&D comparison test May 2003).

3.2 L Supercharged M112 V6 AMG
 2002–2004 C 32 AMG (sedan, wagon (S203), and Sportcoupé)
 2001–2004 SLK 32 AMG
 2005–2006 Chrysler Crossfire SRT-6

"55" 5.4 L V8 KOMPRESSOR 

This model was nicknamed the "Hammer" after the original 1986 AMG Hammer (a W124 E-Class sedan with an AMG-tuned 360 hp 5.6-litre V8). The 2003 E 55 AMG could do 0– in 4.4 seconds.

The main engine is a 5.4 L V8 engine This engine comes in two configurations.
 The first configuration is a naturally aspirated V8 with  that is used in the C 55 AMG, CLK 55 AMG, E 55 AMG (1999-2002), SLK 55 AMG, and ML 55 AMG. The C 43 AMG (model years 1998–2000) was powered by a naturally aspirated V8 engine from the M113 family, but at a reduced displacement of 4.3L, hence the '43' designation.
 The other configuration is a similar unit but with a highly efficient Lysholm type twin screw supercharger, as manufactured by Eaton. This supercharger is found in the rest of the AMG 55 models, which are typically midsized or larger vehicles. For instance, the E 55 AMG's engine was at the low end, yet nonetheless it was still Mercedes-Benz's fastest sedan at the time, while the SL55 AMG's engine had the top output. Mercedes has claimed that a more restrictive exhaust system was responsible for cutting output on the E 55 AMG, however some enthusiasts have managed to bump up horsepower to 505 on the E 55 by incorporating some parts from the SL 55.

The V8 S 55 AMG had an output comparable to the V12-powered S600 throughout its production. The S 55 AMG (2001–02) was outfitted with a 5.4 L  V8 engine while the later versions (2003–06) sported the same motor, but supercharged to a rated . The S600 (2001–02) was outfitted with a 5.8L  V12 engine while the later versions (2003–06) sported a twin-turbocharged (or Bi-Turbo)  5.5L V12. The justification for having two models with the same power is that the S 55 AMG is sportier and more responsive, while the costlier S600 is more luxurious with a smoother ride.

AMG phased out both the naturally aspirated and supercharged 5.4 L engines in favor of the new M156 V8 beginning in 2006, which was paired with 7G-Tronic. However, some enthusiasts were disappointed because the naturally aspirated M156 produces less torque than the supercharged M113K.

For the Model Year 2009:
 M113 5.4 L "55" V8 models (naturally aspirated)
SLK 55 AMG
 M113 5.4 L "55" V8 models (supercharged)
G 55 AMG

Previous 55 AMG models 
 1999–2002 E 55 AMG
 2003–2006 E 55 AMG
 2000–2003 ML 55 AMG
 2003–2005 C 55 AMG
 2001–2002 CLK 55 AMG
 2003–2006 CLK 55 AMG
 2004–2007 CLS 55 AMG
 2001–2008 SL 55 AMG
 2001–2006 S 55 AMG
 2001–2006 CL 55 AMG
 2005–2006 C 55 AMG
 2001–2009 G 55 AMG

"63" M137 6.3 L V12 
The "63" badging was used on the short-lived 2001 S 63 AMG, 2001 CL 63 AMG and 2002 G 63 AMG. These were produced in limited quantities for one month and only offered through AMG to select customers in Europe and Asia, purportedly state leaders. The CL 63 AMG was the rarest C215 CL of all, and just 26 examples were built in November 2001 (51 plate), with some UK being and one for France registered in March 2002. These had a base price of £110,000 (~US$200,000). The G 63 AMG was the rarest W463 of all with just 5 examples built in September 2002 and sold in Germany at over €250,000 each.

These are powered by a naturally aspirated 6.3L V12 producing . It is mated to a 5-speed automatic transmission. The 2001 S 63 AMG V12 had 100 hp more than the 2001 S 55 AMG, and was a few tenths faster.

"60", "73", "70", "55" 
The Mercedes-Benz SL-Class (R129) had several AMG variants during its production run from 1989 to 2001.

The SL 60 AMG was the most numerous of these rare cars. Sold from 1993 to 1998, it used a 6.0 litre V8 engine producing  at 5500 rpm. AMG claimed a 0– speed of 5.6 seconds. AMG later unofficially conceded that  was more like 5.0 seconds and the engine produced between 405 and 410 bhp.

Extremely rare was the SL 73 AMG, sold through Mercedes-AMG in 1995, and offering the most powerful V12 engine ever put into an SL up to that time. After a brief hiatus, the SL 73 was offered again from 1998 to 2001. The same 7.3 L V12 was later used by Pagani in the Zonda.

Even rarer is the SL 70 AMG (7.0 L (7055 cc) V12 engine).

The SL 55 AMG was sold in the R129 body style from 1998 to 2001 in limited numbers (5.4L V8,  at 5500 rpm). It was the predecessor of the production R230 SL 55 AMG sold later, albeit was normally aspirated in the R129 and not supercharged as in its R230 successor.

"63" M156 6.2 L V8 
The "63" M156 is currently in production in the C 63 AMG and tuned as the M159 in the SLS AMG, although there were many models that were previously in production.

This naturally aspirated V8 will also be used to replace most of the "55" models.

The 2008 S 63/CL 63/SL 63s that used the M156 engine at 518 horsepower edged out that of the S600/CL600/SL600, the latter powered by the 510 horsepower 5.5-liter twin-turbo V12, while also having a higher redline. The S 63/CL 63/SL 63, however, do have quicker acceleration times than their S600/CL600/SL600 counterparts and are the fastest in the lineup in 2014, due to the added weight and torque of the 65s, thus decreasing the 0-60 times and the handling limits.

Despite the reduction in torque, the increased horsepower and more efficient transmission enable the 63 models to match or surpass the acceleration of the "55" models. Most of the M156-engined models used the 7G-Tronic automatic transmission, however the more recent 2009 SL 63, 2010 E 63, and 2012 C 63 use the 7-speed MCT transmission.
 Previous M156 Models
 2007–2010 S 63 AMG
 2006–2010 CL 63 AMG
 2007–2011 ML 63 AMG
 2007 R 63 AMG
 2006–2009 CLK 63 AMG (introduced at the 2006 Geneva Motor Show) (used as Safety Car for the 2006 and 2007 F1 World Championship)
 2007–2011 CLS 63 AMG (introduced at the 2006 Geneva Motor Show)
 2007–2009 E 63 AMG (Sedan and Wagon)
 2009–2012 SL 63 AMG
 2010–2012 E 63 AMG (Sedan and Wagon)

Black Series 
 SLK 55 AMG Black Series
 CLK 63 AMG Black Series
 SL 65 AMG Black Series
 C 63 AMG Black Series
 SLS AMG Black Series
 AMG GT Black Series
The AMG Performance Studio in Affalterbach is responsible for the upgrades that make an AMG into an AMG Black Series model. The Black Series treatment is only available on 2 door vehicles, which includes weight reduction, bucket seats, exterior alterations, interior alterations, higher power, greater traction, handling, and significantly greater overall performance. Black Series models are known as street-legal race cars.

The SLS AMG Black Series was tested by Motor Trend to have a 0-60 time of 3.2 seconds, and a quarter mile time of 11.1 seconds at 129.8 mph. The SLS AMG Black Series "demolished" the Motor Trend figure eight in just 23.1 seconds, beating the McLaren MP4-12C, Ferrari 458 Italia, Audi R8 V10 Plus, and the SRT Viper. The SLS AMG Black Series is currently the 22nd fastest car to lap the Nürburgring. The SLS AMG Black Series had the same 1:19 time as the Lamborghini Murciélago LP670-4 SuperVeloce, the Ferrari Enzo, and beat the Ferrari 458 Italia, Lamborghini Gallardo LP 560-4, Porsche 997 GT2, and Nissan GT-R around the Top Gear test track.

Electric Drive 
In 2013, Mercedes-AMG announced the SLS AMG Coupe Electric Drive, which was to be the first zero emissions vehicle from AMG. The vehicle used technology derived from Formula 1, and was the fastest electric car. The SLS AMG Electric Drive has 740 horsepower and 738 lb-ft of torque, and Mercedes-AMG claims a  time of 3.9 seconds.

See also 
List of German cars
Alpina
Audi Sport GmbH
BMW M
Brabus
Gran Turismo
Opel Performance Center

References

Notes

Bibliography

External links

 

Official motorsports and performance division of automakers
Mercedes-Benz
Auto parts suppliers of Germany
Wheel manufacturers
Automotive companies established in 1967
1967 establishments in West Germany
German brands
Deutsche Tourenwagen Masters teams
FIA GT Championship teams
24 Hours of Le Mans teams
Auto tuning companies
ADAC GT Masters teams
Blancpain Endurance Series teams
Mercedes-Benz Group brands and marques
Mercedes-Benz Group subsidiaries
Mercedes-Benz in motorsport
German racecar constructors